Staehle may refer to:

 3875 Staehle, main-belt asteroid

Staehle is a surname, and may refer to:

 Marv Staehle (born 1942), American former Major League Baseball second baseman
 Wolfgang Staehle (born 1950), American artist 
 Hugo Staehle (1826–1848), German composer

 See also
 Stähle